The Australian Schoolboys rugby league team is the national rugby league football team for secondary school students in Australia.

The team competes against counterparts in New Zealand, known as the Junior Kiwis, England, Wales and France amongst others. Started in 1972, the Australian Schoolboys have produced over 50 Australian representatives, amongst a host of players who have represented other nations at the highest level.

History

Early years
Established in 1972, the first Australian Schoolboys rugby league team featured players from New South Wales and one Western Australian player. The team did not include any Queensland players as they did not send players to the trials. Unlike current day Schoolboys, the team was an Under 16 years age division. Coached by future Western Suburbs Magpies Team of the 20th Century coach, Roy Masters, and featuring future internationals Ian Schubert, Craig Young, Les Boyd and Royce Ayliffe, the side toured Great Britain, going undefeated on the tour and scoring 108 tries in their 11 games to their opponents one. This would be the last Schoolboys team until 1978.

In 1978, the first official Australian Schoolboys Championships were held, but NSW Combined Catholic Colleges did not attend. For the first time Queensland based high school players trialled and a merit team was selected. The first of four Schoolboys merit teams, a merit team is chosen based on the trial games but does not tour or play games together.

The Schoolboys returned to touring with the 1979 team, that featured future Australian internationals Ben Elias and Andrew Farrar. The team toured France and England and went undefeated.

1980s
The first Schoolboys side of the 80's was selected in 1981, when the Schoolboys hosted the touring Junior Kiwis side from New Zealand. They played two games with the Schoolboys winning both. It was the first time the Schoolboys hosted a tour and played a New Zealand side.

In 1982, the Schoolboys returned the favour and toured New Zealand for the first time, where they also received their first ever loss, to an Auckland based selection team, 16–10. The team was captained by future Australian international Paul Langmack and featured another future international in Andrew Ettingshausen. Another merit team was selected in 1983 and once again featured Ettingshausen. Future internationals Greg Alexander and Paul Sironen and future first grade regulars, Tony Butterfield and Jeff Hardy, were also a part of the side.

In 1984, the Schoolboys hosted a tour by the British Upper Schools and Colleges (BUSCARLA), winning both matches against the tourists. The 1984 Australian Schoolboys was also the first to feature a player who would go on to represent a country other than Australia at international level. Theo Anast from Armidale High School would later play six games for France between 1993 and 1994.

The team selected in 1985 went undefeated against a touring Junior Kiwis side and in 1986 went undefeated once again on their tour of England. The 1986 side featured future Australian internationals Bradley Clyde and Andrew Gee. In 1987, another merit side was selected, which featured Clyde for the second time.

In 1988, the side toured New Zealand and featured Tim Brasher, David Fairleigh and a 16-year-old Brad Fittler. The team went undefeated. Fittler was named again in 1989, as the Schoolboys hosted the British Amateur Rugby League under 19's (BARLA) for two games, winning both.

1990s
The 1990 Schoolboys side was originally a merit team, but played a one-off game against the Australian Youth Development Squad, which they won 38–6. The 1991 team, once again, went undefeated on their tour of England.

In 1992, with a side featuring future premiership winner and Australian international Steve Menzies, the side toured New Zealand. On the tour, the Schoolboys lost their first ever Test match to a New Zealand side featuring future Kiwis Gene Ngamu, Joe Vagana and Ruben Wiki.

The 1993 Australian Schoolboys hosted BARLA and played two tests, winning both. Future NSW State of Origin player and world champion boxer Anthony Mundine was in the team.

In 1994, the Schoolboys hosted, and defeated, the touring Junior Kiwis. This marked the first appearance of a then 15-year-old Owen Craigie, who would represent the Schoolboys a record three times in 1994, 1995 and 1996. Future Australian internationals Brett Kimmorley, Ben Ikin and Luke Priddis were also in the side.

The 1995 Schoolboys toured France and England and went undefeated. The side featured future Australian internationals Trent Barrett and Matthew Gidley and World Cup winning New Zealand captain Nathan Cayless. 1995 also saw the first ever Northern Territory schoolboy in Duncan MacGillivray. MacGillivary would later represent Scotland at the 2008 Rugby League World Cup.

Due to the ARL and Super League war in 1996, the Schoolboys (who were supposed to tour New Zealand) toured Papua New Guinea for the first time. They went undefeated in their four matches. The team was coached by 1972 Australian Schoolboys representative Brian Hetherington. The team also featured Ben Rauter, whose father Herb also represented the Australian Schoolboys in 1972. Ben and Herb became the first father son pair to represent the Schoolboys.

The side went undefeated in their 1997 when they once again hosted BARLA, in a squad which featured future first graders and representative players Luke Bailey, Dane Carlaw and Luke Patten. In 1998, the Schoolboys toured New Zealand, playing 4 games and losing only one to an Auckland Invitational XIII. The team featured future Australian international Mark Gasnier, who would play for the Schoolboys again the following year. The 1999 side toured France, England and Ireland, going undefeated. The squad featured future Australian internationals Justin Hodges, Jamie Lyon, Corey Parker and Brent Tate.

2000s
The first Schoolboys team of the new millennium hosted a touring New Zealand schools side in 2000, comfortably winning both games. In 2001, the Schoolboys hosted the touring England Academy side and French Schools team. The Schoolboys went undefeated in three games and featured future internationals Greg Bird and Michael Weyman (who would represent again in 2002).

In 2002, on the Schoolboys tour of England and France, they lost two games for the first time on the same tour and lost a test series, when they were beaten by the England Academy side. The Schoolboys side featured a number of future Australian internationals including Weyman, Keith Galloway, Ben Hannant, Ryan Hoffman Tom Learoyd-Lahrs, future Fijian international Ashton Sims and future French international Dimitri Pelo.

The 2003 side, which featured current New Zealand captain Benji Marshall and future Australian international Karmichael Hunt, toured New Zealand winning two games and losing one. In 2004, the Schoolboys hosted the touring English and French teams. They defeated BARLA and a France Schools side but lost to the England Academy team. The 2004 side featured future international Greg Inglis.

The 2005 side played a two games test series against the Junior Kiwis in Australia, winning the first game and losing the second. The team featured future Australian international stars Michael Jennings, David Taylor, Darius Boyd and Akuila Uate. In 2006, the Schoolboys toured Wales, England and France and went undefeated for the first time since 2001. Future representative players Israel Folau, Mitchell Pearce and Chris Lawrence were on the tour.

The Schoolboys then went undefeated on their 2007 tour of New Zealand, in 2008 against the touring England Academy and French Schools sides and in 2009 against the touring Great Britain Community Lions. Over the three years the side featured future first grade players Martin Kennedy, Kieran Foran, Lachlan Coote, Andrew McCullough, William Hopoate, Jamal Idris, Aaron Woods, Jason Taumalolo, Cheyse Blair and Joseph Leilua, amongst a host of others.

2010s
In 2010, the side toured England, Wales and France, winning 4 games and losing two (both to the England Academy). The squad featured future first graders Tautau Moga, Harry Siejka and Jack Wighton.

In 2011, the Schoolboys toured New Zealand and played the Junior Kiwis twice, winning one game and losing one game. Richard Kennar, from Craigieburn Secondary College CAS, became the first Victorian player to play for the Australian Schoolboys.

The 2012 Schoolboys squad featured Mitchell Moses, the nephew of 1979 and 1981 schoolboy representative Ben Elias, and future first graders Dylan Walker and Kelepi Tanginoa. The team defeated the touring England Academy squad in both their encounters, 43–10 in Canberra and 42–14 in Brisbane.

The 2013 side toured New Zealand and featured Jackson Hastings, the son of Sydney Roosters great Kevin Hastings, and Sione Mata'utia, who would go on to make his senior international debut for Australia a year later, becoming Australia's youngest ever representative.

The 2014 side was announced on 14 July and toured France and England in November and December of that year. The side played 7 games, winning 6 of them. The side broke the record for biggest win by the Australian Schoolboys, defeating the Cumbria Combined Regional Academy 86–6.

In 2015, the Schoolboys hosted the touring New Zealand under-18 side, winning both games in the two-game series.

In 2018, the Schoolboys toured England. On the first match of the tour the Schoolboys set a new biggest win record beating the England Colleges team 92–0.

Players

2022 Australian Schoolboys
Keano Kini – Palm Beach Currumbin State High School
Jesse McLean – Newington College, Stanmore
Ethan Ferguson – Lambton High School
Michael Roberts – Palm Beach Currumbin State High School
Chevy Stewart – Endeavour Sports High School
Karl Oloapu – Wavell State High School
Blaize Talagi – Westfields Sports High School
Josiah Pahulu – Ipswich State High School
Gabriel Satrick – Ipswich State High School
Sam Tuivaiti – Westfields Sports High School
Harrison Hassett – The Hills Sports High School
Thomas Fletcher – St Gregory's College, Campbelltown
Chris Fa'agutu – Marsden State High School
Joash Papalii – Holy Spirit Catholic College, Lakemba
Arama Hau – Keebra Park State High School
Liam Le Blanc – St Joseph's College, Nudgee
Jordan Milller - Patrician Brothers' College, Fairfield

 Isaiya Katoa (Barker College, Horsnby) was originally selected but later withdrew, he was replaced by Jordan Miller.

Australian Schoolboys Team of the Century
On 19 September 2008, as a part of rugby league centenary celebrations, Australian Rugby League CEO Geoff Carr and ARL president Bruce Wallace announced the Australian Schoolboys Team of the Century.
Tim Brasher (Grantham High School, NSWCHS)
Andrew Ettinghausen (De La Salle Cronulla, NSWCCC)
Mark Gasnier (Peakhurst High School, NSWCHS)
Justin Hodges (Cairns State High, QSSRL)
Greg Inglis (Wavell State High, QSSRL)
Brad Fittler (McCarthy Senior High, NSWCCC)
Greg Alexander (Patrician Brothers' Fairfield, NSWCCC)
Craig Young (Corrimal High School, NSWCHS)
Danny Buderus (St Francis Xavier's College NSWCCC)
Les Boyd (Nyngan High School, NSWCHS) 
Steve Menzies (Narrabeen High, NSWCHS)
Paul Sironen (Holy Cross Ryde, NSWCCC)
Bradley Clyde (Hawker College ACT)
Tonie Carroll (Beenleigh State High QSSRL)
Ian Schubert (Wauchope High School, NSWCHS)
Matthew Gidley (Glendale Technology High, NSWCHS)
Brent Tate (Clontarf Beach State High QSSRL)

Captains

Royce Ayliffe (1972–1973)
Stephen Hardy (1979–1980)
Brett Gale (1981)
Paul Langmack (1982)
Jason Alchin (1984)
David Rowles (1985)
Mark Soden (1986)
Brett Horsnell (1988)
Jason Croker (1989)
Russell Hill (1990)
Michael Buettner (1991)
Garen Casey (1992)
Ben Walker (1993)
Jason Ferris (1994)
Ronald Davis (1995)
Nathan Cayless (1996)
Owen Craigie (1996)
Ben Galea (1996)
Ted Simpson (1996)
Mark McLinden (1997)
Luke Branighan (1999)
John Rowbotham (1999)
Kai Holland (2000)
Michael Russo (2001)
Unknown (2004)
Blake Green (2005)
Mitchell Pearce (2006)
Martin Kennedy (2007)
Tim Auremi (2008)
Cameron King (2009)
Paul Carter (2010)
Brenden Santi (2011)
Adam Elliott (2012)
Sione Mata'utia (2013)
Ashleigh Nisbet (2014)
Nathan Cleary (2015)
Blayke Brailey (2016)
Campbell Graham (2017)
Zac Lomax (2017)
Jock Madden (2018)
Jackson Topine (2019)

International representatives
Australia

     Jamie Ainscough
     Greg Alexander
     Braith Anasta
     Royce Ayliffe
     Luke Bailey
     Trent Barrett
     Greg Bird
     Darius Boyd
     Les Boyd
     Tim Brasher
     Danny Buderus
     Michael Buettner
     Dane Carlaw
     Tonie Carroll
     Bradley Clyde
     Jason Croker
     Ben Elias
     Andrew Ettingshausen
     David Fairleigh
     Andrew Farrar
     Brad Fittler
     Israel Folau
     Jake Friend

     Keith Galloway
     Mark Gasnier
     Matthew Gidley
     Ben Hannant
     Justin Hodges
     Ryan Hoffman
     Mark Hohn
     Rodney Howe
     Ben Hunt
     Karmichael Hunt
     Jamal Idris
     Ben Ikin
     Greg Inglis
     Michael Jennings
     Alex Johnston
     Brett Kimmorley
     Brent Kite
     David Klemmer
     Paul Langmack
     Chris Lawrence
     Tom Learoyd-Lahrs
     Jamie Lyon

     Sione Mata'utia
     Steve Menzies
     Brad Meyers
     Latrell Mitchell
     Joel Monaghan
     Michael Morgan
     Cameron Murray
     Corey Parker
     Luke Priddis
     Russell Richardson
     Robbie Ross
     Ian Schubert
     Paul Sironen
     Kade Snowden
     Brent Tate
     David Taylor
     James Tedesco
     Jake Trbojevic
     Akuila Uate
     Dylan Walker
     Michael Weyman
     Aaron Woods
     Craig Young

Cook Islands
      Troy Dargan
      Martin Mitchell
Fiji
     Tevita Cottrell
     Lamar Liolevave
     Junior Roqica
     Ashton Sims
     Akuila Uate
France
      Theo Anast
      Jason Baitieri
      Trent Clayton
      Dimitri Pelo
Great Britain
      Jackson Hastings
Greece
      Braith Anasta
      Michael Korkidas
      Nick Kouparitsas
Hungary
      Matiu Fukofuka
Ireland
      Ian Herron
      Jamie Mathiou
      Danny Williams
      Michael Withers
Italy
      Paul Dal Santo
      Mark Minichiello
      Ray Nasso
      Christian Orsini
      Michael Russo
      Brenden Santi
      Kade Snowden
      James Tedesco
Lebanon
      Jalal Bazzaz
      Tim Mannah
      Mitchell Moses
      James Roumanos

Malta
      Luke Branighan
      Jesse Cronin
New Zealand
      Tonie Carroll
      Nathan Cayless
      Kieran Foran
      Benji Marshall
      Sam Perrett
      Kevin Proctor
      Tony Puletua
      Ben Roberts
      Jason Taumalolo
      Martin Taupau
Niue
     Albert Talipeau
Papua New Guinea
      Jay Aston
      Kurt Baptiste
      Nene Macdonald
      Mark Mom
      Lachlan Lam
Poland
      Harry Siejka
Portugal
  Blake Austin
Samoa
    Michael Chee-Kam
    Brian Leauma
    Joseph Leilua
    Luciano Leilua
    Pat Mata'utia
    Peter Mata'utia
    Sione Mata'utia
    Steve Meredith
    Tautau Moga

    Peewee Moke
    Junior Moors
    David Nofoaluma
    Joseph Paulo
    Junior Paulo
    Eddy Pettybourne
    Frank Puletua
    Tony Puletua
    Ben Roberts
    Marion Seve
    Albert Talipeau
    McConkie Tauasa
    Martin Taupau
    Frank Winterstein
    Matthew Wright
Scotland
      Lachlan Coote
      Daniel Heckenberg
      Duncan MacGillivray
Tonga
      Ronnie Alovili
      David Hala
      Solomon Haumono
      William Hopoate
      Phillip Howlett
      George Jennings
      Michael Jennings
      Brent Kite
      Samisoni Langi
      Willie Mataka
      Feleti Mateo
      Tesi Niu
      Jason Taumalolo
United States
      Joseph Paulo
      Junior Paulo
      Eddy Pettybourne

State of Origin representatives
New South Wales

     Jamie Ainscough
     Greg Alexander
     Braith Anasta
     Royce Ayliffe
     Luke Bailey
     Trent Barrett
     Greg Bird
     Phil Blake
     Les Boyd
     Tim Brasher
     David Brooks
     Danny Buderus
     Michael Buettner
     Tony Butterfield
     Steve Carter
     Nathan Cleary
     Bradley Clyde
     Jason Croker
     Ben Elias
     Andrew Ettingshausen
     David Fairleigh
     Andrew Farrar
     Brett Finch
     Brad Fittler
     Keith Galloway
     Mark Gasnier
     Matthew Gidley
     Brian Hetherington
     Ryan Hoffman
     William Hopoate
     Rodney Howe
     Neil Hunt
     Jamal Idris
     Michael Jennings
     Brett Kimmorley
     Brent Kite
     David Klemmer
     Paul Langmack
     Tom Learoyd-Lahrs
     Jamie Lyon
     Tim Mannah
     Steve Menzies
     Latrell Mitchell
     Joel Monaghan
     Jarrod Mullen
     Anthony Mundine
     Ken Nagas
     Mitchell Pearce
     Justin Poore
     Luke Priddis
     Anthony Quinn
     Tony Rampling
     Robbie Ross
     Matt Seers
     Paul Sironen
     Kade Snowden
     Jason Taylor
     James Tedesco
     Jake Trbojevic
     Akuila Uate
     Ricky Walford
     Dylan Walker
     Michael Weyman
     Aaron Woods
     Craig Young

Queensland

     Jai Arrow
     Darius Boyd
     Alan Cann
     Dane Carlaw
     Tonie Carroll
     Israel Folau
     Andrew Gee
     Ben Hannant
     Ashley Harrison
     Tony Hearn
     Justin Hodges
     Mark Hohn
     Ben Hunt
     Karmichael Hunt
     Ben Ikin
     Greg Inglis
     Jacob Lillyman
     Andrew McCullough
     Casey McGuire
     Brad Meyers
     Michael Morgan
     Clinton O'Brien
     Julian O'Neill
     Corey Parker
     Brent Tate
     David Taylor
     Craig Teevan
     Chris Walker
     Rhys Wesser

Coaches
The current coach of the Australian Schoolboys team is Tim White, first grade coach at Holy Cross College, Ryde and NSW Combined Catholic Colleges (NSWCCC) Rugby League Convenor.

Roy Masters 1972–1973
Ray Montgomery 1979–1980
Ray Pendrigh 1981
Bob McGuiness 1982
David Waite 1984, 1986
Geoff Snowden 1985
Arthur Sauverain 1988–1989
Bob Cullen 1990
Peter Sollis 1991–1992
Bruce Wallace 1993–1995
Brian Hetherington 1996–1997
Mark Greer 1998–1999
Michael McEntyre 2000–2002
Rod Patison 2003–2004
Simon Huntly 2005–2007
Brendan Barlow 2008–2010
Peter Denham 2011–2014
Brian Battese 2015-2016
Tony Adam 2017–2019
Tim White 2021–present

See also

Junior Kangaroos
List of Australia Schoolboy rugby league team players

References

External links
Official Australian Secondary Schools Rugby League website

High school sports in Australia
Junior rugby league
Schoolboys
Rugby league representative teams in Australia